Bitterfeld is a town in the district of Anhalt-Bitterfeld, Saxony-Anhalt, Germany. Since 1 July 2007 it has been part of the town of Bitterfeld-Wolfen. It is situated approximately 25 km south of Dessau, and 30 km northeast of Halle (Saale). At the end of 2016, it had 40,964 inhabitants.

History and description

The name Bitterfeld most likely comes from the Middle High German words bitter and Feld and so means "boggy land".

Bitterfeld was built by a colony of Flemish immigrants in 1153. The first documentary mention is from 1224. It was captured by the landgrave of Meissen in 1476, and belonged thenceforth to Saxony, until it was ceded to Prussia in 1815.

By 1900, Bitterfeld station was an important junction of the Berlin–Halle and the Magdeburg–Leipzig railways. The population at that time was 11,839; it manufactured drainpipes, paper roofing, and machinery, and had sawmills. There were also several coal mines in the vicinity. Owing to its pleasant situation and accessibility, it became a favoured residence of businessmen of Leipzig and Halle.

During the East German (GDR) era, it gained notoriety for its chemical industry complex which caused remarkably severe pollution, even by GDR standards. On 24 April 1959, it also was a scene for the Bitterfeld Conference, locally known as the "Bitterfelder Weg". This conference sought to connect the working class with the artists of the day to form a socialist national culture.

In the 21st century Bitterfeld is still an industrial town and it stages the annual United Metal Maniacs metal festival.

The former brown-coal open cast mine of Goitzsche, south-east of Bitterfeld, is a source of numerous fossils in Bitterfeld amber.

Historical population

(from 1840 to 2006):

Sons and daughters of the town
 Johann Ernst Altenburg (1736-1801), trumpeter and organist
 Erwin Ding-Schuler (1912-1945), sturmbannführer and first camp doctor of Buchenwald
 Peter Rasym (born 1953), musician, has been playing bass guitar since 1997 with the Puhdys

Other personalities

 August von Parseval (1861-1942), his impact airships developed by him were partly built in Bitterfeld. 
 Walther Rathenau (1867-1922), founder of Bitterfeld's chemical industry.
 Klaus Staeck (born 1938), graphic artist, lawyer and president of the academy of the arts, grew up in Bitterfeld.

Mayors

 1851-1863 Gottlieb Meuche
 1863-1873 Gustav Frischbier
 1873-1890 Robert Sommer († 1890)
 1890-1914 Hugo Hermann Adalbert Dippe (1853; † 1916)
 1915-1927 Ernst Albert Hermann Schmidt 
 1927-1939 Arthur Erdmann Ebermann
 1939-1945 Erhard Johann Martin Nimz
 1943-1945 Walter Stieb (Interim)
 26 April 1945 to 30 August 1945 Gustav Dietrich (deselection by Soviet city commandant) († 1972)
 September 1945 to 1946 Bernhard Moder
 1946-1949 Ernst Rettel
 1949-1950 Karl Salbach
 1950-1953 Heinz-Rudolf Strauch
 1953-1959 Wolfgang Stille
 1959-1971 Else Petrushka
 1971-1979 Max Dittbrenner
 1979-1982 Karlheinz Sohr
 1982-1990 Klaus Barth
 1990-1994 Edelgard Kauf
 1994-2007 Werner Rauball
 2007-2009 Horst Tischer
 From 2010 Joachim Gülland

Literature 
 Maron, Monika: Bitterfelder Bogen. Ein Bericht. Fischer Verlag, Frankfurt am Main 2009, .
 Lojewsky, Hannelore: Seh’n wir uns nicht in dieser Welt, so seh’n wir uns in Bitterfeld. In: Norbert Kühne: Individuelles Lernen wird an Bedeutung gewinnen. 100 Jahre Hans-Böckler-Berufskolleg Marl/Haltern, Marl 2009, S. 29–30.
 Klaus Seehafer: Dann sehn wir uns in Bitterfeld. Tagebuch eines Jahres. Mitteldeutscher Verlag, Halle/S. 2009, .
 
 Hackenholz, Dirk: Die elektrochemischen Werke in Bitterfeld 1914–1945. Ein Standort der IG-Farbenindustrie AG. LIT Verlag, Münster 2004, .

Notes

References

External links

Flemish diaspora
Towns in Saxony-Anhalt
Anhalt-Bitterfeld